Sorsby's fundus dystrophy (SFD) is a very rare genetic disorder characterized by the loss of central vision. It was first described by Sorsby and Mason in 1949.

Signs and symptoms 
Patients typically become symptomatic in their 40s due to loss of central vision. However, tests of rod photoreceptor function (i.e., night vision tests) show dysfunction at an earlier age. One of the most sensitive visual function parameters for early SFD is a prolongation of rod-mediated dark adaptation. High-resolution structural imaging of the Bruch's membrane and of the underlying choriocapillaris – the capillary plexus nourishing the outer retina – also shows early alterations.

Genetics 
The inheritance pattern is autosomal dominant. It is related to a mutation in the TIMP3 gene.

Diagnosis

Treatment

References

External links 

 Sorsby's fundus dystrophy at OMIM
 Sorsby's fundus dystrophy at Orpha.net

Genetic diseases and disorders